Halldór Guðmundsson (born 1956 in Reykjavík) is an Icelandic author. He was also chairman of the publishing company Mál og menning and its successor after the merger with JPV, Forlagið.

His biography of Halldór Laxness was awarded the Icelandic Literary Prize. The book has also appeared in English and German.

Halldór's 2006 book Skáldalíf, about the Icelandic writer Gunnar Gunnarsson, was chosen best biography of the year by the Icelandic Booksellers' Association and nominated for the Icelandic Literary Prize.

In We are all Icelanders (2009), he discusses how the financial crisis affected ten different Icelanders, including an architect, a politician and a kindergarten nurse.

In Mamutschkas Lebensrezepte, published in German, he tells the story of restaurant operator Marianne Kowalew.

Publications 
 Loksins, loksins: vefarinn mikli og upphaf íslenskra nútímabókmennta. Reykjavík: Mál og menning, 1987. OCLC 22972223
 Halldór Laxness—ævisaga. Reykjavík: JPV, 2004. . English ed. trans. Philip Roughton: The Islander: A Biography of Halldór Laxness. London: Maclehose Press, Quercus, 2008. 
 Skáldalíf: ofvitinn úr Suðursveit og skáldið á Skriðuklaustri. Reykjavík: JPV, 2006. 
 Mamutschkas Lebensrezepte. Ed. and trans. Regina Kammerer. Munich: Random House-Bertelsmann, 2010.

References

External links

1956 births
Living people
Halldor Gudmundsson
Halldor Gudmundsson
Halldor Gudmundsson
Halldor Gudmundsson